Rubus anglocandicans is a species of bramble endemic to England.

Description
Rubus anglocandicans is an arching shrub with a shiny, furrowed stem. The stem bears numerous robust prickles. Leaves invariably have 5 non-overlapping leaflets; these are hairless above and white felted below. Flowers are white.

Habitat and Distribution
Rubus anglocandicans is a plant of woodland edges, hedges and lowland heaths. Its native range stretches in a band from the Cotswolds north east to the Yorkshire coast.

Impact as an introduction
Rubus anglocandicans is widespread as an introduced plant in Australia. It is classified as a 'weed of national significance', due to its impact on areas of conservation and of forestry. In recent years, R. anglocandicans has declined in some regions of Australia; the plant pathogen Phytophthora bilorbang is believed to have some connection to this decline.

References

anglocandicans